Kimiko Date was the defending champion and won in the final 7–5, 6–0 against Amy Frazier.

Seeds
A champion seed is indicated in bold text while text in italics indicates the round in which that seed was eliminated.

  Kimiko Date (champion)
  Sabine Appelmans (semifinals)
  Naoko Sawamatsu (semifinals)
  Amy Frazier (final)
  Patty Fendick (quarterfinals)
  Yayuk Basuki (first round)
  Mana Endo (first round)
  Shi-Ting Wang (second round)

Draw

External links
 1994 Japan Open Tennis Championships Draw

Singles